Twice Upon a Time is the seventh studio album by American country music artist Joe Diffie. It was released on April 22, 1997, through Epic Records. Singles released from the album include "This Is Your Brain",  "Somethin' Like This", and "The Promised Land", which respectively reached #25, #40, and #61 on the Billboard Hot Country Singles & Tracks (now Hot Country Songs) charts. "The Promised Land" was also the second single of Diffie's career to miss Top 40 entirely, and this was also the first album of his career not to produce a Top 10 hit. Furthermore, the album did not earn an RIAA certification. Also included is  "I Got a Feelin'", which was originally recorded by Tracy Lawrence on his 1994 album I See It Now.

Doug Virden and Drew Womack, who then recorded for Epic as members of the band Sons of the Desert, are featured as background vocalists on this album.

Track listing

Personnel
Lee Bogan – background vocals
Joe Diffie – lead vocals, background vocals
Stuart Duncan – fiddle
Paul Franklin – steel guitar
Brent Mason – electric guitar
Randy McCormick – piano, organ, keyboards
Terry McMillan – harmonica
Steve Nathan – piano, organ, keyboards
Matt Rollings – piano, organ, keyboards
John Wesley Ryles – background vocals
Doug Virden – background vocals
Billy Joe Walker Jr. – acoustic guitar
Jenna Werling – background vocals
John Willis – acoustic guitar
Lonnie Wilson – drums, percussion
Drew Womack – background vocals
Glenn Worf – bass guitar

Chart performance

References

1997 albums
Joe Diffie albums
Epic Records albums